Jean Nougayrol was a French cuneiformist who studied a number of the Amarna letters.

Career
Nougayrol studied Hebrew under Georges Boyer before becoming interested in cuneiform writing. He was particularly interested in Babylonian divination. While studying at the École Biblique in Jerusalem in 1935, he began to study Cylinder seals and published a book about them. He was curator of Oriental Antiquity at the Louvre from 1947 to 1960. In 1968, he became a member of the Académie des Inscriptions et Belles-Lettres.

Some publications 
Une Fable babylonienne, Gembloux, impr. de J. Duculot, 1941
Cylindres-sceaux et empreintes de cylindres trouvés en Palestine (au cours de fouilles régulières), Paris, P. Geuthner, 1939
Note sur la place des « Présages historiques » dans l'extispicine babylonienne, Melun, Impr. administrative, 1945
Charles Fossey (1869-1946), Paris, Imprimerie nationale, 1947
Le Palais royal d'Ugarit III (planches), Textes accadiens et hourrites des archives Est, Ouest et centrales, publié sous la direction de Claude F.-A. Schaeffer, avec des études de Georges Boyer et Emmanuel Laroche, Paris, C. Klincksieck (Impr. nationale), 1955
Le Palais royal d'Ugarit III, Textes accadiens et hourrites des archives est, ouest et centrales, publié sous la direction de Claude F.-A. Schaeffer, avec des études de G. Boyer et E. Laroche, Paris, Imprimerie nationale, 1955
Le Palais royal d'Ugarit, publié sous la direction de Claude F.-A. Schaeffer, ... III ; Textes accadiens et hourrites des archives Est, Ouest et centrales, avec des études de Georges Boyer et Emmanuel Laroche, Paris, C. Klincksieck (Impr. nationale), 1955, 2de éd. 1956
Le Palais royal d'Ugarit III, Textes accadiens et hourrites des archives Est, Ouest et Centrales, Paris, Klincksieck, 1955
Extrait de Ugaritica V [Texte imprimé] : textes suméro-accadiens des archives privées d'Ugarit, Paris, 1968
Mission de Ras Shamra dirigée par Claude F. A. Schaeffer, ... 12, Le Palais royal d'Ugarit, publié sous la direction de Claude F. A. Schaeffer 6, Textes en cunéiformes babyloniens des archives du grand palais et du palais sud d'Ugarit, Paris, P. Geuthner, 1970
Rapport sur les travaux de l'École archéologique française de Jérusalem en 1970-1971 et 1971-1972 [Texte imprimé] : lu dans la séance de l'Académie des inscriptions et belles-lettres du 9 février 1973, Paris, éd. Klincksieck, 1973
Rapport sur les travaux de l'École archéologique française de Jérusalem en 1972-1973 et 1973-1974 [Texte imprimé] : lu dans la séance de l'Académie des inscriptions et belles-lettres du 27 septembre 1974 (par M. Jean Nougayrol et André Parrot), Paris, éd. Klincksieck, 1974
Le babylonien, langue internationale de l'Antiquité = Babilonščina, mednarodni jezik v antiki, Ljubljana, Slovenska akademija znanosti in umetnosti, 1975
Les « silhouettes de référence » de l'haruspicine, Kevelaer, Butzon & Bercker, 1976
La Mésopotamie, Paris, Bloud et Gay, 1965

See also 
Amarna Letter EA2

References

External links 
 Jean Nougayrol on data.bnf.fr

Writers from Toulouse
1900 births
1975 deaths
Academic staff of the École pratique des hautes études
French Assyriologists
Members of the Slovenian Academy of Sciences and Arts
Corresponding Fellows of the British Academy